The men's 3000 metres event  at the 2001 IAAF World Indoor Championships was held on March 9–11.

Medalists

Results

Heats
First 5 of each heat (Q) and the next 2 fastest (q) qualified for the semifinals.

Final

References
Results

3000
3000 metres at the World Athletics Indoor Championships